University of Massachusetts may refer to:

University of Massachusetts, a five-campus public university system of the Commonwealth of Massachusetts comprising:
University of Massachusetts Amherst, the flagship campus
University of Massachusetts Boston
University of Massachusetts Dartmouth
University of Massachusetts Lowell
University of Massachusetts Medical School

Other institutions with similar names may refer to:
Massachusetts Bay Community College
Massachusetts College of Art and Design
Massachusetts College of Liberal Arts
Massachusetts Maritime Academy

See also
List of colleges and universities in Massachusetts